Tote Du Crow (also known as George Skyrock or Shyroch) was a film actor and circus performer who acted in many silent films during the early days of Hollywood.

Biography
Tote was born in Watsonville, California, to parents of Castilian and French origins. According to some accounts, as children, Tote and his brother Daniel ran away from home to join the circus; other sources say their father apprenticed them out to a circus showman.  

Tote Du Crow portrayed Bernardo in the silent Zorro films. Gene Sheldon later popularized this role for Disney in the late 1950s. Sheldon's depiction of that character was a full-blooded Spaniard. 

He played 36 minor roles from 1915 until his death. His last film is The Blue Streak from 1926.

Selected filmography

 The Americano (1916) as Alberto de Castille
 The Fighting Trail (1917)
 Rimrock Jones (1918)
 Treasure of the Sea (1918)
 The Ghost Flower (1918)
 Hugon, The Mighty (1918)
 The Prospector's Vengeance (1920)
 Hair Trigger Stuff (1920)
 The Rattler's Hiss (1920)
 The Moon Riders (1920)
 The Mark of Zorro (1920) as Bernardo, Zorro's deaf / mute assistant
 The White Horseman (1921)
 The Man of the Forest (1921)
 The Vermilion Pencil (1922)
 The Pride of Palomar (1922)
 The Social Buccaneer (1923)
 Thundergate (1923)
 The Thief of Bagdad (1924)
 Little Robinson Crusoe (1924)
 The Saddle Hawk (1925)
 Women and Gold (1925)
 Don Q, Son of Zorro (1925) as Bernardo
 Spook Ranch (1925)
 The Prairie Pirate (1925)
 The Blue Streak (1926)

References

External links

1858 births
1927 deaths
American male film actors
American male silent film actors
People from Watsonville, California
Male actors from California
Native American male actors
20th-century American male actors